Poblana ferdebueni, the Chignahuapan silverside is a species of neotropical silverside endemic to Mexico. This species was described by Aurelio Solórzano Preciado and Irma López-Guerrero in 1965 from a type locality of Laguna de Almoloya, Chignahuapan Lake, Puebla State, Mexico and was given the specific name ferdebueni to honour the Spanish ichthyologist Fernando de Buen y Lozano (1895-1962) who had originally proposed the genus Poblana.

References

ferdebueni
Endemic fish of Mexico
Freshwater fish of Mexico
Fish described in 1965
Taxonomy articles created by Polbot
Oriental Basin